Grahanam is a 2004 Indian Telugu-language film directed by Indraganti Mohan Krishna. Based on Dosha Gunam a story written by Chalam, The film won critical acclaim upon release and received National Film Award, for the Best Debut Film of a Director. The film premiered at the 36th International Film Festival of India, the 2004 Seattle First Independent South Asian Film Festival and the 2004 Mumbai Asian Film Festival. The film won two Nandi Awards.

Plot 

Dr. Raghavram is a practicing physician in a small village. Another doctor and a nurse work along with him at the clinic. One day when he is on his rounds, he comes upon a quarrel between a patient and his mother. The patient expresses disgust and claims to have no relationship with his mother. The patient's mother leaves in tears and Dr.Raghavram follows her to tell her that her son is now OK. When he asks her for her name and where she came from, she walks away without answering his questions. The doctor is intrigued and delves into the details of the patient and finds out the patient's name is Vasudeva.

After work, the doctors tell his friend that the old woman was from his village. He proceeds to narrate a story from the days of his youth. When the Doctor was merely a young boy he lived in a small village. In that small village lived a wealthy family, Narayana Swamy, his wife Sardamba and their young son, Vasudeva. They were a kind and generous couple who contributed to the welfare of the community. Saradamba, in particular, was regarded as pious, religious, generous and also very beautiful. She would sponsor lunch meals for students. Among the students is a boy called Kanakayya, who was also a very good student. Saradamba is very fond of Kanakayya and showers him with love and affection. Kanakayya too is very fond of Saradamaba and does errands around the house for Saradamba, such as giving her foot massages and plucking mangoes from the garden.

One day Kanakayya gets sick. He has a high fever that refuses to break. The village physician, Sri Hari claims it is a stubborn viral fever and gives him medicine but there seems to be no immediate relief. Kanakkaya's fever gets worse and he mutters "Saradamba" over and over in a delirious state. Kanakayya's family brings in a doctor, Gopayya who practices alternative medicine. Gopayya claims that its "Dosha gunam", an STD that young men get from having sex with older women. The treatment for Doshagunam is to apply the blood extracted from the thigh region of the older woman into the eyes of the young man. Kanakayya's family struggles with this information and word gets out. Narayana Swamy comes to hear of this and starts to suspect his wife. Saradamba too hears of this from Kanakayya's mother and becomes furious. Later, when Narayana Swamy brings this up with his wife it results in a huge quarrel.

Kanakayya gets even worse and Gopayya claims there is no more time to lose. Kanakayya's father approaches Narayana Swamy for Saradamba's blood. Fearing the boy's death might result in greater scandal, Narayana Swamy extracts the blood from Saradamba forcefully. Sometime after Gopayya administers the blood to Kanakayya, the boy recovers from the grips of the viral fever. Narayana Swamy upon hearing that Kanakaya is now better, accuses his wife of infidelity and makes her leave the village. Kanakkaya learns of what happened when he recovers but no one is willing to listen to him.

The Doctor asks his friend about his take on the story. The friend replies that there is no way to tell what actually happened but must take into consideration that Kanakayya did get better. perhaps there was an illicit relationship between Kanakkaya and Saradamba. The Doctor counters by saying that it might have merely been a coincidence that Kanakkaya's fever broke after the application of blood. The friend replies that there is no way to conclude this and that the nature of the relationship is only known to two people, Kanakkaya and Saradamaba.

At this point, the doctor reveals that he is Kanakkaya and that there was nothing illicit between him and Saradamba. He moved out of his house, went to Madras to become a Doctor and changed his name. The next day the Doctor goes back to the hospital to find the patient in a critical state and the doctor saves his life. He goes out to the place where he saw the old woman in hope she will return.

"Unless you believe in some principles to be true, there can be no peace. The intellect of all those who say "this is all we know, this what there is" is weak and fatigued. Perhaps there is another explanation, another truth, perhaps we don't know it yet!"- Chalam

Cast
 Thallavajhula Mohnish as Kanakayya
 Tanikella Bharani as Narayana Swamy
 Jayalalitha	as Saradamba
 Surya as Dr. Raghav
 Thallavajhula Sundaram as Gopayya
 Kamal as Srinivas
 G. Ramana as Subramaniam
 Sivannarayana
 Jyoti as Lakshmi
 Thallavajhula Sundaram as Village Doctor
 Rachakonda Vidya Sagar as Sri Hari

Awards
National Film Awards - 2004
 Indira Gandhi Award for Best Debut Film of a Director - Indraganti Mohan Krishna

Nandi Awards - 2004
 Best First Film of a Director - Indraganti Mohan Krishna
 Third Best Feature Film - Bronze - Subba Rao, Anji Reddy & P. Venkateswara Rao

Other awards
 Gollapudi Srinivas Award - Indraganti Mohan Krishna - 2006

External links

References

2000s Telugu-language films
2004 films
Indian black-and-white films
Best Debut Feature Film of a Director National Film Award winners
Films directed by Mohan Krishna Indraganti
Films scored by K. Vijay